The Women's CEV Champions League, formerly known as CEV Champions Cup (from 1960 to 2000), is the top official competition for women's volleyball clubs of Europe and takes place every year. On 13 November 2000, it was officially presented in Florence under a new format and renamed .

Formula
The competition has changed its format since the first fourteen teams took part at the inaugural edition in 1960–61. Through the  era, as the number of participating teams has changed over time, the competition moved from an only knockout tournament to include a round-robin format between the final four competitors to determine the champion.

The best teams advance to the playoffs and one team is selected to be the host of the "Final four" (receiving a bye from the playoffs and qualifying directly to the final four). The teams paired for the playoffs play a double-elimination until three teams remain, these three teams join the final four host to play the semifinal, 3rd place match and final. The final four takes place between March and April.

History 
 CEV Champions Cup (1960 to 2000)
 CEV Champions League (2000 to present)

Finals

In the 1961–62 season, the finalists was qualified by a home-and-away format in group stage round. 

From the 1961–62 season, the knockout stage was played on the same format in the 1960–61 season.

From the 1971–72 season, the final round was played on the round robin format.

Titles by club

Titles by country
For the purpose of keeping historical event accuracy, historical countries names are used in this table.

MVP by edition
2001–02 – 
2002–03 – 
2003–04 – 
2004–05 – 
2005–06 – 
2006–07 – 
2007–08 – 
2008–09 – 
2009–10 – 
2010–11 – 
2011–12 – 
2012–13 – 
2013–14 – 
2014–15 – 
2015–16 – 
2016–17 – 
2017–18 – 
2018–19 – 
2019–20 – Competition cancelled
2020–21 – 
2021–22 –

All-time team records 
Winners and finalists by city since 1960/1961

Various statistics since 1990/1991

(Based on W=2 pts and D=1 pts)

See also 
 Men's 
 CEV Champions League
 CEV Challenge Cup
 CEV Cup
 FIVB Volleyball Men's Club World Championship
 Women's
 CEV Women's Champions League
 CEV Women's Challenge Cup
 CEV Cup Women's
FIVB Volleyball Women's Club World Championship

References
 European Cups
 CEV 40th Anniversary Book - European Cups
 L'Équipe

Citations

External links

 Website of the CEV – Confederation Europeenne de Volleyball
 List of Champions League medal positions at The-sports.org

 

 
League
European volleyball records and statistics
Recurring sporting events established in 1960
1960 establishments in Europe
Women's volleyball leagues
Multi-national professional sports leagues